Dag, stylized as DAG, was a Dutch-language tabloid newspaper in the Netherlands that was freely distributed between 2007 and 2008. It was released jointly by publishing company PCM and telecommunications company KPN. Bob Witman was the editor-in-chief.

The first edition of Dag was published on 8 May 2007 with a circulation of 300,000 copies, accompanied with the launch of the website. It competed with long-time free newspapers Metro and Spits, as well as De Pers which had started on 23 January of that year. The paper and the website were noted for its clear layout, its extensive use of images, and much attention for reactions of the general public. It was reported that in the one and a half year that followed, a maximum of 20 million euro would be invested. In September 2007, the circulation was raised to 400,000, and a Saturday magazine edition and an experimental delivery service were launched.

On 29 September 2008, PCM and KPN announced that the newspaper would cease to exist. The reason was that the direction of Dag had failed to bind enough advertisers, mainly because of the fierce competition of the other free newspapers. The worsening global financial situation around that time also made it more likely that companies would save money on advertisement and sponsoring. The last issue was released on 1 October 2008, but the digital activities of Dag (online, mobile, and narrowcasting) were continued by PCM without support of KPN.

References

2007 establishments in the Netherlands
2008 disestablishments in the Netherlands
Defunct free daily newspapers
Defunct newspapers published in the Netherlands
Defunct Dutch websites
Dutch-language newspapers
Publications established in 2007
Publications disestablished in 2008
Daily newspapers published in the Netherlands